Gold Ship is a Japanese Thoroughbred racehorse. In a racing career which began in July 2011, he ran twenty-eight times and won thirteen races. As a two-year-old in 2011, he won his two of his four races. In 2012, he won the Satsuki Shō and the Kikuka Shō, the first and third legs of the Japanese Triple Crown. In December, he defeated a strong field in the weight-for-age invitational Arima Kinen, which led to his being rated the best three-year-old racehorse in the world by some authorities. As a four-year-old, he ran disappointingly in the Tennō Shō but returned to form to win the Takarazuka Kinen. As a five-year-old, Gold Ship became the first horse to record a second victory in the Takarazuka Kinen and in 2015 he added a win in the Tennō Shō. He was known for his unpredictable temperament, with major wins being interspersed with inexplicably poor efforts.

Background
Gold Ship is a light-coloured grey horse bred in Japan by his owner Eiichi Kobayashi. His sire, Stay Gold, a son of the thirteen-time Leading sire in Japan Sunday Silence, was a successful international performer, winning the Dubai Sheema Classic and the Hong Kong Vase. Standing at stud at the Big Red Farm in Hokkaido, he produced numerous important winners including Dream Journey, Orfevre, and Nakayama Festa. Gold Ship's dam, Point Flag, from whom he inherited his grey coat, was a daughter of the Hall of Fame inductee Mejiro McQueen.

Racing career

2011: two-year-old season
Gold Ship began his racing career in Hokkaido by winning a maiden race at Hakodate Racecourse on 9 July and followed up with a win in the nine-furlong Cosmos Stakes at Sapporo Racecourse on 10 September. He was then moved up to Group Three class to contest the Sapporo Stakes over the same course and distance on 1 October. He started at odds of 7/2 and finished second, half a length behind the winner, Grandezza. On his only other start of the season, he finished second to Adam's Peak in the Group Three Radio Nikkei Hai Nisai Stakes over ten furlongs at Hanshin Racecourse on 24 December.

2012: three-year-old season
On his first appearance as a three-year-old, Gold Ship contested the Group Three Kyodo News Service Hai (Tokinominoru Kinen) at Tokyo Racecourse in February. Ridden for the first time by Hiroyuki Uchida, he overtook the leader, Deep Brillante, inside the final furlong to record his first win by one and three quarter lengths. In April at Nakayama Racecourse Gold Ship started at odds of 6.1/1 for the Satsuki Shō, the first leg of the Japanese Triple Crown. Apparently relishing the extremely wet conditions, he came from last place to take the lead in the straight and won by two and a half lengths from World Ace and Deep Brilante, with Grandezza and Adam's Peak unplaced. Gold Ship was made the 2.1/1 second favourite for the Tokyo Yushun (Japanese Derby) over one and a half miles and finished fifth, one and a half lengths behind the winner, Deep Brillante.

Gold Ship returned from the summer break in the Group Two Kobe Shimbun Hai, a trial race for the Kikuka Shō (Japanese St Leger), at Hanshin on 27 September. He started the 1.3/1 favourite and won by two and a half lengths from fifteen opponents. A month later, he started odds-on favourite for the Kikuka Shō over fifteen furlongs at Kyoto Racecourse and won by one and three quarter lengths from Sky Dignity. As in the Satsuki Shō, the colt came from last place before he "cruised" to victory, although the competition was less strong than anticipated following the late withdrawal of Deep Brillante, who had sustained a tendon injury.

Gold Ship was one of sixteen horses to be invited to contest the all-aged Arima Kinen at Nakayama on 23 December. He was towards the back  of the field before moving up on the wide outside on the approach to the straight. In the closing stages, he overtook the leaders and won by one and a half lengths from Ocean Blue, with Uchida standing up in the irons and saluting the crowd as he crossed the line. The 42-year-old jockey won for the first time after recovering from a broken back sustained in a fall in May 2011. Naosuke Sugai said that the horse would stay in Japan in 2013 before challenging for international races such as the Dubai World Cup and Prix de l'Arc de Triomphe in 2014, saying that "this is just the beginning for him". Britain's Racing Post described the winner's performance as "a stunning display" whilst pointing out that Japan's other two outstanding middle-distance horses, Orfevre and Gentildonna, had bypassed the race.

2013: four-year-old season
Gold Ship began his four-year-old season on 17 March in the Group Two Hanshin Daishoten, a trial race for the Tennō Shō. Starting at odds of 1/10 he won the fourteen-furlong race by two lengths from Desperado. On 28 April, the colt was moved up further in distance for the two-mile Tennō Shō at Kyoto. He started odds-on favourite and finished fifth of the eighteen runners behind Fenomeno. On 23 June, Gold Ship met Fenomeno again in the Takarazuka Kinen at Hanshin Racecourse where the field, which was decided by public ballot, also included Gentildonna. Orfevre was withdrawn from the race after bleeding after an exercise gallop on 14 June. Uchida positioned the grey just behind the early leaders before moving up on the outside in the straight. He hit the front inside the final furlong and drew clear to win by three and a half lengths from the five-year-old Danon Ballade, with Gentildonna third and Fenomeno fourth.

Gold Ship's autumn campaign began in the Grade II Kyoto Daishoten on 2 October. He was made the 1/5 favourite and finished fifth of the thirteen runners behind the 165/1 outsider Hit The Target. Sugai offered several explanations for the colt's poor run, including the unseasonably hot weather, the fast track, and an unfavourable draw. On 24 November, Gold Ship started second favourite behind Gentildonna for the Japan Cup. He was never in contention at any stage and finished fifteenth of the seventeen runners. For the horse's last race of the year, the British jockey Ryan Moore took over from Uchida in the Arima Kinen. He started at odds of 17/5 and finished third behind Orfevre and Win Variation.

2014: five-year-old season
Gold Ship began his fourth season by repeating his 2013 success in the Hanshin Daishoten: he started the 7/10 favourite and won by three and a half lengths from Admire Rakti. On 4 May, Gold Ship started 3.3/1 second favourite for the Tennō Shō but was never near enough to challenge and finished seventh of the eighteen runners behind Fenomeno. On 29 June at Hanshin, he attempted to become the first horse to record back-to-back victories in the Takarazuka Kinen. Ridden by Norihiro Yokoyama, he started the 17/10 favourite in a field of twelve which included Gentildonna, Meisho Mambo, Tosen Jordan, Verxina, Denim And Ruby, and Win Variation. Gold Ship started poorly but recovered well and raced behind the leaders on the outside before taking the lead in the straight. He drew away in the closing stages to win by three lengths from the 55/1 outsider Curren Mirotic. After the race, Yokoyama said, "He's a clever horse and whether he performs well or not depends on his mood. So I'm relieved that he lived up to the expectations of many fans".

Gold Ship was then aimed at the Prix de l'Arc de Triomphe in France and began his preparation for the race with a run in the Grade 2 Sapporo Kinen over ten furlongs at Sapporo Racecourse on 24 August. He finished second, beaten three-quarters of a length by Oka Sho winner Harp Star. Sugai said that it was "no disgrace to fail" when attempting to concede eleven pounds to the three-year-old filly. In the Arc de Triomphe on 5 October, Gold Ship started at odds of 12.9/1 in a three-horse Japanese challenge which also included Harp Star and Just A Way. After becoming agitated in the pre-race parade, he started poorly and raced at the back of the twenty-runner field for most of the way. He made some progress in the straight but never looked likely to make a serious challenge and finished fourteenth of the twenty runners, seven lengths behind the winner, Treve. Shortly after his return from Europe, Gold Ship topped the poll to decide the runners for the Arima Kinen. At Nakayama on 28 December he started the favourite for the Arima Kinen ahead of Epiphaneia, Just A Way and Gentildonna. He made steady progress on the outside in the straight but was unable to reach the leaders and finished third, beaten three quarters of a length and a nose by Gentildonna and To The World.

2015: six-year-old season
On his first appearance of the new year, Gold Ship produced what the Racing Post described as a "dismal display" when finishing unplaced in the American Jockey Club Cup at Nakayama on 25 January. On 23 March Gold Ship recorded his 2015 campaign by winning the Hanshin Daishoten for the third consecutive time. On 4 May he made his third attempt to win the spring edition of the Tennō Shō and started second favourite behind Kizuna in a seventeen-runner field. He started slowly and was towards the rear for the first half of the race, but made rapid progress on the back straight and turned for home in fourth place. Curren Mirotic opened up a clear lead, but Gold Ship produced a sustained run to take the lead in the final strides and won by a neck from the fast-finishing Fame Game. After the race Yokoyama said "I was thinking of going front if he started well, which obviously was not the case. From there on, I just concentrated on following the pace and careful not to turn him off. In the straight, he really showed his stamina and perseverance". On 28 June, the grey started 9/10 favourite as he attempted a record third win in the Takarazuka Kinen. After appearing to panic in the starting stalls he lost many lengths at the start and finished fifteenth of the sixteen runners behind Lovely Day. Yokoyama commented "I'm not sure what had happened in his mind because he can't tell us... he is just Gold Ship".

Gold Ship returned in the autumn of 2015 for two more races before retirement. On 29 November he started the 3.7/1 second favourite for the Japan Cup. He finished tenth  but was only three lengths behind the winner Shonan Pandora. He ended his racing career by running for the fourth time in the Arima Kinen on 27 December. He was made 3.1/1 favourite but finished eighth of the sixteen runners behind Gold Actor. Gold Ship's retirement ceremony followed the race.

Assessment and awards
Following his win in the 2012 Arima Kinen, the Racing Post rated Gold Ship the best three-year-old in the world, one pound ahead of Camelot, I'll Have Another, and Dullahan. Although he finished second to the filly Gentildonna in the vote for Japanese Horse of the Year he was the unanimous winner of the JRA Award for Best Three-Year-Old Colt. In the 2012 edition of the World Thoroughbred Racechorse Rankings Gold Ship was rated the second-best three-year-old colt, one pound behind I'll Have Another, and the thirteenth best horse in the world.

In 2013, Gold Ship was rated the eleventh-best racehorse in the world in the World's Best Racehorse Rankings  and the equal second best four-year-old behind Novellist and level with Declaration of War. He was again rated eleventh in the 2014 edition of the rankings.

In the JRA Awards for 2014, Gold Ship finished third to Just A Way and Epiphaneia in the poll for the JRA Award for Best Older Male Horse.

Stud Record 
As of 2023, Gold Ship stands at Big Red Farm in Niikappu, Hokkaido at a stud fee of JPY 2,000,000.

Notable Progeny 
c = colt, f = filly, g = gelding

In Popular Culture 
Gold Ship received renewed attention in 2021 when the smartphone game of Uma Musume Pretty Derby was released, as an anthromorphized version of the horse was featured in both the game and the anime. That same year, Gold Ship came in 5th place at the "2021 Net Buzz Word of the Year" while his Uma Musume counterpart came in 2nd place.

Pedigree

References

Racehorses bred in Japan
Racehorses trained in Japan
2009 racehorse births
Thoroughbred family 16-h